California's 19th State Senate district is one of 40 California State Senate districts. It is currently represented by Democrat Monique Limón of Santa Barbara.

District profile 
The district encompasses the coast from Point Mugu to Santa Maria. This district primarily consists of scattered small- to medium-sized cities and communities, with Los Angeles urban sprawl encroaching from the east.

All of Santa Barbara County
 Buellton
 Carpinteria
 Goleta
 Guadalupe
 Lompoc
 Santa Barbara
 Santa Maria
 Solvang

Ventura County – 61.3%
 Camarillo
 Fillmore
 Ojai
 Oxnard
 Port Hueneme
 Santa Paula
 Ventura

Election results from statewide races

List of senators 
Due to redistricting, the 19th district has been moved around different parts of the state. The current iteration resulted from the 2011 redistricting by the California Citizens Redistricting Commission.

Election results 1992 - present

2020

2016

2012

2008

2004

2000

1996

1992

See also 
 California State Senate
 California State Senate districts
 Districts in California

References

External links 
 District map from the California Citizens Redistricting Commission

19
Government of Santa Barbara County, California
Government of Ventura County, California
Camarillo, California
Carpinteria, California
Fillmore, California
Goleta, California
Lompoc, California
Ojai, California
Oxnard, California
Santa Barbara, California
Santa Maria, California
Santa Paula, California
Santa Ynez Valley
Solvang, California
Ventura, California